Daniel Carpenter may refer to:

Dan Carpenter (born 1985), former American football player 
Daniel C. Carpenter (1816–1866), American law enforcement officer and police inspector of the New York Police Department